Susan Lawrence Dana (October 13, 1862 - February 21, 1942) was an American philanthropist and heiress to a substantial fortune, including silver mines in the Rocky Mountains. After her father died, Lawrence Dana took over his western mines and properties throughout central Illinois. She was also a leading philanthropic figure in Illinois - she held fundraisers or parties for Springfield charities, including the King’s Daughters Home for Aged Women, the Home for the Friendless and several others. She also commissioned Frank Lloyd Wright to create a library for the Lawrence Education Center, named after her father.

In the 1920s, Lawrence Dana was heavily involved with the National Woman’s Party (NWP) and its efforts to gain equal rights for women. The NWP appointed Dana as the legislative chairwoman for the Illinois branch in 1923. In this role, she organized meetings and communications, and lobbied the legislature. She was in regular correspondence with Alice Paul and Burnita Shelton Matthews regarding these efforts. Lawrence Dana also arranged for Anita Pollitzer, National Secretary of the NWP, to give a speech at her house in the 1923. She also hosted a number of other events that focused on social justice. Lawrence Dana was appointed by Illinois Governor Edward F. Dunne as the only woman member of the Commission Half-Century Anniversary of Negro Freedom in 1913. She also served as a members of the Executive Committee of the Sangomon County Republican women's organization. After experiencing the death of family members and two husbands, Lawrence Dana began a spiritual journey, which led to her efforts in the creation of Springfield’s Unity Church of Practical Christianity.

Dana Thomas House 

Susan Lawrence Dana is notable as one of the few women to engage with Frank Lloyd Wright as an architect at this point in his career. However, Lawrence Dana’s bold design sensibilities, paired with a staid commitment to advancing social justice for women and within the African American community through political involvement, thus mark her as a truly unique and progressive patron of architecture at the turn of the century. The project grew and became a blonde Roman brick mansion with 35 rooms on 16 different levels. An anomaly in Springfield, the Dana Thomas House is a masterpiece that still stands today as one of Wright's finest Prairie designs. 

Lawrence Dana paid $45,000 for the construction and an additional $15,000 for the Wright-designed furnishings. She lived the home from 1904 until about 1928. In her later years, Lawrence Dana became less socially active and engaged in her philanthropic work. Suffering from increasing financial constraints, she closed the main house around 1928 and moved to a small cottage on the grounds. As Lawrence Dana struggled with age-related dementia in the 1940s, her home and its contents were sold.

References 

1862 births
1942 deaths
American philanthropists